Holiday Lovers is a 1932 romantic comedy film from the United Kingdom. It is written by notable screenwriter and director Leslie Arliss, directed by Jack Harrison and stars Margery Pickard, George Vollaire, Pamela Carme and George Benson in his debut role. Filming took place at Wembley Studios under the supervision of Hugh Perceval, the head of Fox productions U.K, with production design by J. Elder Wills. It is the first film of Harry Cohen  Productions and marks the return of film making to Wembley Studios after a major fire.

When a man and woman of modest means meet on a Brighton pier they begin a holiday romance. However, when they each act rich to dupe the other, there are unintended consequences.

Cast
 Margery Pickard
 George Vollaire
 Pamela Carme
 Boris Ranevsky
 George Benson as Oswald
 Wyn Weaver as Lord Winterton
 Vincent Holman as Salesman

Release
"Holiday Lovers" premiered on 10 November 1932 at The Hippodrome, London in a Fox Film double bill with "Six Hours to Live", a U.S. science fiction thriller.

Reception
In his review for The Era newspaper on 16 November 1932 Jack Payne wrote that Holiday Lovers "opens brightly but flops mid way. Naive story likely to cause some laughter in the wrong places."

References

External links
 
 

1932 films
Films directed by Leslie Arliss
British black-and-white films
British romantic comedy films
1932 romantic comedy films
1930s British films